John B. Weller (February 22, 1812August 17, 1875) was the fifth governor of California from January 8, 1858, to January 9, 1860, who earlier had served as a congressman from Ohio and a U.S. senator from California, and minister to Mexico.

Life and career
Weller was born in Hamilton County, Ohio, and attended the public schools and Miami University in Oxford, Ohio. He then studied law, was admitted to the bar and practiced in Butler County, Ohio. He was prosecuting attorney of Butler County from 1833 until 1836.

He 1838 he was elected as a Democrat from Ohio to the 26th Congress.  He was reelected to the 27th and 28th Congresses, serving from 1839 until 1845.

He served in the 1st Regiment of Ohio Volunteers as a Lieutenant Colonel during Mexican–American War from 1846 until 1847, and then was an unsuccessful Democratic candidate for Governor of Ohio in 1848, a bitterly fought campaign, and the only disputed election for Ohio Governor of the 19th century. A select joint committee of the Ohio General Assembly finally established January 22, 1849, that Weller lost by 311 votes to Whig Seabury Ford.

In 1849 and 1850, he was a member of the commission to establish the boundary line between California and Mexico. He was replaced by President Zachary Taylor, a Whig, who first named John C. Frémont.  After Frémont resigned without beginning his duties, Taylor appointed John Russell Bartlett.

Weller then settled in California and practiced law. When Frémont's term as a U.S. Senator expired on March 3, 1851, the state legislature failed to elect a replacement for the term that started on March 4, so the position remained vacant.  In January 1852, the legislature elected Weller, and he served from January 30, 1852, to March 3, 1857. During the 34th Congress he was chairman of the U.S. Senate Committee on Military Affairs.

After running unsuccessfully for reelection to the Senate, in 1857 he was elected Governor of California and he served from 1858 to 1860. As Governor, he intended to make California an independent republic if the North and South divided over slavery, and he personally led an assault on San Quentin Prison to take possession from a commercial contractor. 
Weller also sanctioned the genocide of the Yuki Tribe through the granting of a State Commission to Walter Jarboe, who was later hired by Weller after US Army Generals refused to join his campaign against the Yuki. Jarboe's band, 'The Eel River Rangers' massacred at 
least 283 men (Jarboe did not list women and children he killed), presenting the State with a bill for $11,143. According to Benjamin Madley, Weller 'officially sanctioned Genocide'.

After leaving the governorship, he was appointed Ambassador to Mexico near the end of 1860 by the lame-duck Buchanan administration.  He presented his credentials in 1861, but was soon recalled by the new Lincoln Administration. He moved to New Orleans, Louisiana, in 1867, where he continued the practice of law and served as a U.S. Commissioner.

Death and burial
He died in New Orleans in 1875. Original interment was at Laurel Hill Cemetery in San Francisco. His remains were moved to Girod Street Cemetery in New Orleans. That burying ground was destroyed in 1959 and unclaimed remains were commingled with 15,000 others and deposited beneath Hope Mausoleum, St. John's Cemetery, New Orleans.

Family
Weller's first wife was Ann E. Ryan, who died in 1836.  In 1840, he married Cornelia A. Bryan, who died in 1842.  He married Susan McDowell Taylor in 1845, and she died in 1848; she was a daughter of William Taylor, niece of Thomas Hart Benton, and cousin of Jessie Benton Frémont.  In 1854, he married Elizabeth Brockelbank Stanton.

Weller's father-in-law, John A. Bryan, was a U.S. diplomat. His brother-in-law, Charles Henry Bryan, was a California State Senator.

References

Sources

External links
John B. Weller biography at the California State Library

Dates of service as Mexican Ambassador

1812 births
1875 deaths
19th-century American diplomats
Democratic Party governors of California
Miami University alumni
People from Montgomery, Ohio
American military personnel of the Mexican–American War
People from Hamilton County, Ohio
People from Butler County, Ohio
Democratic Party United States senators from California
Ohio lawyers
County district attorneys in Ohio
Democratic Party members of the United States House of Representatives from Ohio
19th-century American politicians
Burials at Girod Street Cemetery
19th-century American lawyers
Burials at Laurel Hill Cemetery (San Francisco)